Scotton can refer to:

Places in England

Scotton, Lincolnshire, near Gainsborough, Lincolnshire
Scotton, Richmondshire, near Catterick, Richmondshire, North Yorkshire
Scotton, Harrogate, near Knaresborough, Harrogate, North Yorkshire

Surname 
Edward Scotton, MP for Devizes 1656-1660
William Scotton (1856–1893), Nottinghamshire cricketer

See also
 Scotto, a name
 Scottown (disambiguation)